Eragrostideae is a tribe of grasses in subfamily Chloridoideae. It contains roughly 500 species, which all use the C4 photosynthetic pathway.

The 14 genera are classified in three subtribes:

References

Chloridoideae
Poaceae tribes